The United States Air Force's Air Force Satellite Control Facility (AFSCF) was a space command and control unit located at Onizuka AFS, California. It has the distinction of being heavily involved in the world's first reconnaissance satellite program, CORONA. Due to geological hazards (i.e. earthquakes), and the terrorism threat from its proximity to a major transportation link (California Highway 101), the facility's command and control functions were moved to Schriever AFB, Colorado.

History
The Air Force Satellite Control Facility (AFSCF) was originally activated at Los Angeles AFS, California on 18 Jun 1965. It was first assigned to the Space Systems Division of Air Force Systems Command, with later moves under the Space and Missile Systems Organization, and Space Division organizations.

On 15 October 1961, Air Force Systems Command designated the Thule Tracking Station (TTS), a Remote Tracking Station (callsign: Polar Orbiting Geophysical Observatory (POGO)) of the Air Force Satellite Control Network near Thule Air Base in Greenland. It became Operating Location 5, 6594th Test Wing (Satellite). The Thule Tracking Station reached operational status on 30 March 1962, with "transportable antenna vans parked in an old Strategic Air Command bomb assembly building." The permanent RTS equipment was emplaced in 1964, and a communications terminal was emplaced on Pingarssuit Mountain—Thule Site N-32.

In 1992 the Thule Tracking Station became Detachment 2, 22nd Space Operations Squadron.

Previous designations
 Consolidated Space Test Center (2 Oct 1987 – 27 Aug 1993)
 Air Force Satellite Control Facility (18 Jun 1965 – 1 Oct 1987)
 6594th Aerospace Test Wing (1 Nov 1961 – 1 Jul 1965)
 6594th Test Wing (Satellite) (15 Jan 1960 – 1 Nov 1961)
 6594th Test Wing (6 Apr 1959 – 15 Jan 1960)
 Field Office of Air Force Ballistic Missile Division (15 Aug 1958 – 6 Apr 1959)

Assignments

Major Command/Field Operating Agency
Air Force Space Command (??-27 Aug 1993)
Air Force Systems Command (1 Jul 1965-27 )

Elements assigned
 6594th Aerospace Test Wing (6 Apr 1959 – 1 Jul 1965)
 Detachment 1, Donnelly Radio Relay Site, Delta Junction, Alaska (15 Apr 1962 – 1 Jul 1965)
 6594th Support Group (1 Jul 1965 – 1 Oct 1987)
 6594th Recovery Control Group (1 Jul 1965 – 30 Sep 1986)
 6594th Launch Squadron (1 Jun 1959 – 15 Jul 1961)
 6594th Data Processing Squadron (1 Jul 1959 – 1 Oct 1960)
 6596th Instrumentation Squadron, Vandenberg AFB, California (1 Jul 1959 – 30 Jun 1972)
 6594th Instrumentation Squadron (1 Oct 1959 – 1 Jul 1965)
 6595th Test Squadron (20 Feb 1961 – 1 Jul 1965)

Detachments
Det 1 – Sunnyvale, California (1 Jul 1965 – 1 Jul 1977)
Det 2 – Vandenberg Tracking Station, California (1 Oct 1979 – 1 Oct 1987)
Det 3 – Thule Tracking Station, Greenland (1 Oct 1979 – 1 Oct 1987)
Det 4 – Mahé, Seychelles (15 Jul 1972 – 1 Oct 1987)
Det 5 – Guam Tracking Station, Guam (1 Oct 1979 – 1 Oct 1987)
Det 6 – Hawaii Tracking Station, Hawaii (1 Oct 1979 – 1 Oct 1987)
Det 7 – Sunnyvale AFS (later Onizuka AFS), California (17 Apr 1987 – 30 Sep 1987) (later moved to Los Angeles AFS, California from 30 Sep 1987 until inactivation on 15 Jul 1991)

Bases stationed
Sunnyvale AFS (later, Onizuka AFS/AFB), California (8 Jul 1977 – 27 Aug 1993)
Los Angeles AFS, California (18 Jun 1965 – 8 Jul 1977)

Spacecraft operated
KH-1/2/3/4 CORONA (1959–1972)
Global Positioning System (GPS)
Fleet Satellite Communications System (FLTSATCOM)
Various satellites of the Space Test Program

See also
6594th Test Group
National Reconnaissance Office
Onizuka Air Force Station

References

External links
 Air Force Space Command
 National Reconnaissance Office

National Reconnaissance Office
United States Air Force
Military units and formations in California